The Kondor D 2 was a German single seat, biplane fighter aircraft designed and built close to the end of World War I.

Design and development
The Kondor D 2 was a basically a redesign of the D 1, which had proven underpowered in flight tests. Like the D 1, the D 2 was a single-seat biplane of wooden construction, powered by an  Oberursel Ur.II rotary engine and armed with two  LMG 08/15 Spandau machine guns. However, the D 2 differed from its predecessor in having equal span wings with a two-spar lower wing with parallel inter-plane struts. The first flight of the Kondor D 2 took place in May 1918, in time for the second D-type competition at Aldershof in June 1918. Oberleutnant Hermann Göring praised the aircraft's flying qualities, but criticised the poor performance, consequently the D 2 was not ordered into production.

Confusion reigned after the competition, up to the present day, because the Idflieg referred to the two D 2 prototypes as the D.I and D.II during the competition, which were actually fictitious designations.

The first D 2 prototype had ailerons on the upper wings, while the second D 2 prototype had ailerons on both upper and lower wings.

Specifications (D 2)

References

Bibliography

 

Biplanes
Single-engined tractor aircraft
1910s German fighter aircraft
Aircraft first flown in 1918
Rotary-engined aircraft